"Ný batterí" (Icelandic for "new batteries") is a song by Sigur Rós, released as the second single from their album Ágætis byrjun in May 2000. The first track is an extended brass intro for "Ný batterí" (credited as "performed by the SS brass band"), followed by the title track. "Bíum bíum bambaló" is a traditional Icelandic lullaby, while "Dánarfregnir og jarðarfarir" was a theme used in Iceland for death announcements on radio. The third and fourth tracks also appear on the Angels of the Universe soundtrack.

The cymbal used in "Ný batterí" was found on a street in downtown Reykjavík. The instrument was bent and had apparently been driven over. However, they liked the way it sounded and wrote the song from there.

Track listing
"Rafmagnið búið" – 4:52
"Ný batterí" – 7:50
"Bíum bíum bambaló" – 6:52
"Dánarfregnir og jarðarfarir" – 4:29

Covers
The post-hardcore band Thursday covered this song as a bonus track on the Japanese version of their album War All The Time.

References

2000 singles
Sigur Rós songs
Thursday (band) songs
Icelandic-language songs
1999 songs